Lazarus Walter Macior (August 26, 1926 Yonkers - October 5, 2007) was an American botanist. He was professor emeritus and Distinguished Professor in Biology at the University of Akron.

Life
Walter Aloysius Macior Jr. was the son of Walter Aloysius Macior and Alice Mary Macior.
He graduated from Columbia University, and from the University of Wisconsin.

He served in World War II as a Japanese linguist.
He became a member of the Franciscan Friars of the Assumption, in 1956.
He was professor at the University of Akron, from 1967 to 2000.
He was a Faculty Research Associate at the University of California, Davis, in 1984.

A scholarship at the University of Akron was named for him.

Works

Macior, W. A. and E. B. Matzke 1951. "An Experimental Analysis of Cell-Wall Curvatures, and Approximations to Minimal Tetrakaidecahedra in the Leaf Parenchyma of Rhoeo discolor." American Journal of Botany 38(10): 783-793.

References

External links
http://kiki.huh.harvard.edu/databases/botanist_search.php?id=88830
http://botany.org/PlantScienceBulletin/PSB-2008-54-4.pdf

American botanists
1926 births
2007 deaths
People from Yonkers, New York
Columbia University alumni
University of Wisconsin–Madison alumni
University of Akron faculty
Scientists from New York (state)